Smolec  (German: Schmolz) is a village in the administrative district of Gmina Kąty Wrocławskie, within Wrocław County, Lower Silesian Voivodeship, in south-western Poland. 

It lies approximately 12km north-east of Kąty Wrocławskie, and only 1,2 km south-west of the regional capital Wrocław, within its metropolitan area.

The village has an approximate population of 5,000 including new neighbourhood site.

References

Smolec